The  ('Order of Arts and Letters') is an order of France established on 2 May 1957 by the Minister of Culture. Its purpose is the recognition of significant contributions to the arts, literature, or the propagation of these fields.

Its origin is attributed to the Order of Saint Michael (established 1 August 1469), as acknowledged by French government sources.

Background
To be considered for the award, French government guidelines stipulate that citizens of France must be at least thirty years old, respect French civil law, and must have "significantly contributed to the enrichment of the French cultural inheritance".

Membership is not, however, limited to French nationals; recipients include numerous foreign luminaries. Foreign recipients are admitted into the Order "without condition of age".

The Order has three grades:
  (Commander) — medallion worn on a necklet; up to 20 recipients a year
  (Officer) — medallion worn on a ribbon with rosette on left breast; up to 60 recipients a year
  (Knight) — medallion worn on a ribbon on left breast; up to 200 recipients a year

The  (medallion) of the Order is an eight-pointed, green-enameled asterisk, in gilt for Commanders and Officers and in silver for Knights; the obverse central disc has the letters "A" and "L" on a white-enameled background, surrounded by a golden ring emblazoned with the phrase . The reverse central disc features the head of Marianne on a golden background, surrounded by a golden ring bearing the words . The Commander's badge is topped by a gilt twisted ring.

The ribbon of the Order is green with four white stripes.

Members of the Order

However, in the statutes, there is a clause saying "". (Translation: "The officers and commanders of the Legion of Honour can be promoted directly to an equivalent grade in the Order of Arts and Letters".) This means that if someone were to be made  of the Legion of Honour, then the next year, that person could be directly made  of the Order of Arts and Letters and bypass a nomination as a knight and the five-year rule.

See also
 Ribbons of the French military and civil awards
 , a Quebec order based in part on the

References

External links 

 

Awards established in 1957
1957 establishments in France
Civil awards and decorations of France
 
Orders of merit